
Gmina Baborów is an urban-rural gmina (administrative district) in Głubczyce County, Opole Voivodeship, in south-western Poland.

Towns and settlements
 Towns: Baborów
 Villages: Babice, Boguchwałów (with Wierzbno), Czerwonków, Dziećmarowy, Dzielów, Księże Pole, Langowo, Raków, Sucha Psina, Sułków, Szczyty, Tłustomosty (with Langowo and Rogów)

Neighbouring gminas
Gmina Baborów is bordered by the gminas of Głubczyce, Kietrz, Pawłowiczki, Pietrowice Wielkie, Polska Cerekiew and Rudnik.

Twin towns – sister cities

Gmina Baborów is twinned with:
 Hradec nad Moravicí, Czech Republic
 Teublitz, Germany

References

Baborow
Głubczyce County